Piasco is a comune (municipality) in the Province of Cuneo in the Italian region Piedmont, located about  southwest of Turin and about  northwest of Cuneo.

It is home to the only museum of harps in the world.

References

Cities and towns in Piedmont